The Icelandic Women's Football Cup is the national women's football cup competition in Iceland. The first edition of the cup was played out in 1981.

List of finals
The list of finals:

By team

See also
Icelandic Men's Football Cup

References

External links
Official website
Cup at women.soccerway.com
  IcelandFootball.net - Women's National Cup. 

Ice
Women
Recurring sporting events established in 1981
Cup